Rong is the pinyin romanization of several Chinese family names, which including 戎 Róng, 融  Róng, 荣 Róng, 容 Róng, etc. Among these names, 荣 Róng and 容 Róng are relatively common. during the early Zhou Dynasty, Rong (戎) people the "Rong You" (戎右) get surname Rong (戎).

Notable people

容 Róng 

Rong Hong (Yung Wing) (Chinese: 容閎), the first Chinese student to graduate from a U.S. university
Terence Yung, concert pianist
Rong Guotuan (Chinese: 容國圑), ping pong player
Joey Yung (Chinese: 容祖兒), Hong Kong singer
John C. Young (Chinese: 容兆珍); Chinese American; key figure in the development of Chinatown, San Francisco

荣 Róng 
Rong Yiren (Chinese: 榮毅仁), vice-president of China
Rong Zhijian (Chinese: 榮智健), son of Rong Yiren
Rong Hao, football defender

Chinese-language surnames
Multiple Chinese surnames